Just Say Anything was Sire Records' Volume 5 of Just Say Yes and was originally released on July 23, 1991  as a CD sampler.  It contained remixes and non-album tracks of artists on the label, most of which were considered new wave or modern rock (all would eventually fall under the genre alternative rock). This album carried the Parental Advisory labeling—this was noted in the album's opening track, "Warning Parental Advisory".

Track listing
 John Wesley Harding & Steve Wynn - Warning Parental Advisory
 Body Count Featuring Ice-T - Body Count
 Royal Crescent Mob - Timebomb (Single Mix)
 Seal - Crazy
 Dinosaur Jr - Puke + Cry
 Judybats - Don't Drop the Baby
 Ride - Today
 Throwing Muses - Not Too Soon
 Primal Scream - Higher Than The Sun
 Morrissey - That's Entertainment
 The Mighty Lemon Drops - Another Girl, Another Planet
 Richard X. Heyman - Falling Away
 Danielle Dax - Big Blue '82 (Zen Mix)
 My Bloody Valentine - Honey Power
 Bigod 20 - Carpe Diem (Transmission Mix)
 Merlin - Feel The Fury
 The Farm - Groovy Train
 The Ocean Blue - The Planetarium Scene

Its continued success further fueled a series of subsequent albums, the subtitles of which were variations on the 'Just Say' theme:

Just Say Yes Volume I: Just Say Yes (1987)
Just Say Yes Volume II: Just Say Yo (1988)
Just Say Yes Volume III: Just Say Mao (1989)
Just Say Yes Volume IV: Just Say Da (1990)
Just Say Yes Volume VI: Just Say Yesterday (1992)
Just Say Yes Volume VII: Just Say Roe (1994)

1991 compilation albums
Alternative rock compilation albums
New wave compilation albums
Sire Records compilation albums